Peter Kwong may refer to:

 Peter Kwong (academic) (1941–2017), Chinese professor of Asian American studies at Hunter College in New York City
 Peter Kwong (bishop) (born 1936), Chinese Anglican bishop in Hong Kong
 Peter Kwong (actor) (born 1952), Chinese television and film actor